33 Arch Street is a contemporary highrise in the Financial District and Downtown Crossing neighborhoods of Boston, Massachusetts. The building was completed in 2004 after three years of construction, which began on June 5, 2001. It was designed by Elkus Manfredi Architects.

History
The builders had proposed a transparent glass building but ran into opposition from the historic Old South Meeting House.

When the building was completed, it had a hard time finding tenants due to an office space glut and stood vacant upon completion. By 2005, 56% of the office space was rented and the average rent on a monthly parking space was $350.

In March 2010, 33 Arch Street was awarded the LEED Gold designation from the U.S. Green Building Council. In November 2010, the building was selected as BOMA's 2010-2011 Outstanding Building of the Year in the 500,000-1 Million Square Feet category.

Design and features

Architecture
The building has a unique wing shape to maximize the use of its tight footprint. The building strikes a balance with its surroundings and neighboring buildings through the use of the granite stone facade used to add to continuity of the urban streetscape. Yet, it is distinct from its neighbors by the extensive use of metal and glass in its exterior.

The building facade features grey granite, glass and aluminum cladding. Twenty floors cantilever over adjacent retail space and a garage, which is connected to parking on the first six levels. The roof has a distinctive top that sets it apart from nearby flat roofs in the skyline. It features a curved penthouse and roof fins.

The building uses four levels of external bracing transfer the enormous loads of the high building into the small base. The bracing continues through the parking levels to the foundation; perimeter and internal moment frames act as the lateral system above the braced levels. The building was the first to be built in downtown Boston under new Safety Guidelines-Subpart R for steel.

Development credits
Architect: Elkus/Manfredi Architects, Ltd.
Structural Engineer: Weidlinger Associates, Inc.
MEP Engineer: Cosentini Associates, Inc.
Developer: Congress Group Ventures
General Contractor: Bovis Lend Lease LMB/Congress Group Construction Joint Venture
Interior Construction: Spaulding & Slye Construction, a member of the Jones Lang LaSalle group 
Curtainwall: Gordon H. Smith Corporation
Drywall: T.J. McCartney, Inc.
Elevators: Draper Elevator Interiors

Tenants
ACE Group
Digitas
Securities and Exchange Commission
United States Department of Education 
DLA Piper
Ameriprise Financial Services
QuickPivot (formerly Extraprise)
Databento
CBRE Group
WeWork

See also

 List of tallest buildings in Boston

References

External links

 33 Arch Street official building site
 Elkus Manfredi
 Views from top floors
  — with photos
 Photo by Robert Benson of Stubbins Associates interior design of Digitas Inc.’s office
 Emporis.com

Skyscraper office buildings in Boston
Office buildings completed in 2004